Yarur is a surname. Notable people with the surname include:

Juan Jorge Giha Yarur (born 1955), Chilean-born Peruvian sports shooter
Jorge Yarur Banna (1918-1991), Chilean banker
Juan Yarur Lolas (1894-1954), Chilean banker
Luis Enrique Yarur Rey (born 1951), Chilean banker

See also
Yarur Palace, historic castle in Chile